Between March 29–31, 2022, a line of strong to severe thunderstorms and multiple supercells swept through portions of the United States and brought widespread wind damage and several strong tornadoes across a large part of the Midwestern, Southern, and Eastern United States. An EF3 tornado was confirmed in Springdale, Arkansas, while an EF1 tornado passed close to downtown Jackson, Mississippi. Numerous tornadoes, some of which were strong occurred over Mississippi, Alabama the evening of March 30 and into the early morning of March 31. Multiple tornadoes also occurred in the Florida Panhandle, including an intense EF3 tornado that killed two people and injured three others near Alford, Florida, and in other states such as North Carolina and Pennsylvania. Producing a total of 90 tornadoes, this was the largest tornado outbreak of 2022.

Meteorological synopsis

On March 25, the Storm Prediction Center (SPC) issued an outlook highlighting the potential for organized severe weather across portions of the Southern Plains and Southeast United States beginning on March 29. This region had already been affected by a significant tornado outbreak just days prior. Subsequent forecasts increased the risk level across portions of the Southeast, in addition to encompassing sections of the Mid-Atlantic into March 31. While March 29 translated to a level 2/Slight risk of severe weather stretching from Iowa southward to Texas, a broader and more significant threat area began to materialize across the Southeast valid for the following day. The SPC outlined an expansive level 4/Moderate risk of severe weather stretching from Louisiana and Arkansas eastward through Alabama. In this region, forecasters noted the potential for an extensive squall line capable of producing hurricane-force damaging winds and numerous tornadoes, some of which could be significant/EF2 or greater. These predictions were further expanded to include portions of Tennessee and Florida.

Synoptically, forecasters highlighted a broad upper-level trough over the Western United States as the impetus for a potential severe weather outbreak. A potent and negatively-tilted shortwave was expected to round the base of this larger trough, providing substantial upper-level divergence for thunderstorm development across a broad region. This feature was anticipated to significantly increase mid- and low-level wind shear as it progressed from Texas northeastward into Kentucky on March 30. At the surface, a quickly deepening area of low pressure was forecast to move across Missouri and Illinois, providing significant advection of moist air into its open warm sector. Widespread convection initiated along the dry line across the Southern Plains on March 29, congealing into an organized squall line as the potent upper-level system continued to translate eastward. By the pre-dawn hours of March 30, observations across the Arklatex and Ozarks showed modest CAPE and very strong wind shear, a combination that suggested some potential for supercells capable of producing large hail, wind damage, and isolated tornadoes.

Shortly after 09:00 UTC, a tornado developed in Washington County, Arkansas, causing EF3 damage to an elementary school and a large warehouse building in Springdale. It resulted in seven injuries. Into the afternoon hours, with continued moisture advection and surface heating contributing to additional instability, a well-organized squall line began to intensify as it moved across Arkansas, Louisiana, Mississippi, and eventually into Alabama. Across central and coastal sections of these states, environmental conditions became more conducive for the squall line to devolve into a series of semi-discrete supercell thunderstorms, with a heightened risk of tornadoes. As the night progressed, multiple strong supercells embedded within the larger storm system developed across Mississippi, Alabama, and the Florida Panhandle. Entering a highly favorable environment for maturing, the storms began producing tornadoes, some of which were long-tracked, causing severe damage. A long-tracked, intense tornado occurred in central Alabama, passing through Perry and Bibb counties. By the early morning hours of, the severe weather shifted to the Florida Panhandle, where an intense supercell developed near Pensacola. This supercell would produce multiple tornadoes along its track, the first one of which prompted a PDS tornado warning near the towns of Harold and Holt, in Santa Rosa County. Later on, another supercell developed further east, becoming tornadic over Washington County, and another PDS tornado warning was issued for Alford. Two people were killed and three others were injured by a strong EF3 tornado that destroyed multiple homes and mobile homes near the town. Later that day, scattered tornadoes touched down across areas of the Eastern United States as far north as Pennsylvania before the outbreak came to an end.

Confirmed tornadoes

March 29 event

March 30 event

March 31 event

Impact
Amtrak's Texas Eagle was heavily delayed by severe weather that moved through the Texarkana area on the morning of March 30. The City of New Orleans and the Cardinal were also delayed by downed trees and other debris blocking the right-of-way on March 31. The northbound and southbound Carolinian were both delayed by severe warnings in Virginia. Intense winds relating to the system on March 31 forced flight cancellations out of major airports in Washington DC, Baltimore, New York City and Boston, as well as lead to a 3-car pileup in Iota, Louisiana.

Intense gradient winds ahead of the severe storms downed numerous trees and power lines in Alabama. Arcing power lines sparked over 60 wildfires in the state as well.

See also

Weather of 2022
List of North American tornadoes and tornado outbreaks
List of tornadoes striking downtown areas of large cities

Notes

References

External link
 ABC 33/40 Severe Weather Coverage - March 30, 2022

2022 meteorology
2022 natural disasters in the United States
Tornado outbreak
Tornadoes of 2022
Tornado outbreaks
Tornadoes in Alabama
2022 in Alabama
Tornadoes in Arkansas
2022 in Arkansas
Tornadoes in Mississippi
2022 in Mississippi
Tornadoes in Florida
2022 in Florida
Tornadoes in Kansas
2022 in Kansas
Tornadoes in Missouri
2022 in Missouri
Tornadoes in Louisiana
2022 in Louisiana
Tornadoes in Pennsylvania
2022 in Pennsylvania
Tornadoes in Tennessee
2022 in Tennessee
Tornadoes in Texas
2022 in Texas
Tornadoes in North Carolina
2022 in North Carolina
Tornadoes in Virginia
2022 in Virginia
Disasters in North Carolina
F3 tornadoes